Watsonella is a genus of 'mollusc' known from early (Terreneuvian) Cambrian strata.

The genus is closely related to Anabarella, with which it bears many morphological similarities, including a laminar internal shell microstructure said to connect it with the early bivalves Fordilla and Pojetaia.

Biostratigraphic significance
Watsonella has been proposed as an index fossil of the Cambrian, defining a W. crosbyi zone.  Notwithstanding the weakness of a first appearance datum as a definition for the base of a period, the species has been proposed as a marker for the base of the presently unratified second stage of the Terreneuvian (i.e. Cambrian Stage 2).   However, the species has now been found late in the FOrtunian, drawing back its first occurrence. But that said its occurrence in Australia seems to begin rather near the base of Stage 2.

Affinity 
Widely thought to be a mollusc, the connection between the two 'valves' of Watsonella recalls the configuration of Rostroconchs (a group thought to be paraphyletic to bivalves and scaphopods). Similarities to the shells of certain bivalves seem to place Watsonella closer to the bivalve crown group than typical rostroconchs, though there is not yet enough evidence for an unequivocal classification.

Evidence for a molluscan affinity: (though for a sceptical view see )

 Marginal accretion 

 No rostrum or pegma, so not a rostroconchs after all

 ?Aragonitic shell, perhaps, but not preserved. Two microstructural layers: lamello-fibrillar within spherulitic prismatic—see 

 Untorted, endogastric 

 "Stem bivalve" – based on microstructure, timing, and the fact that it looks like it has two valves

 Cf. Anabarella, which also has a similar microstructure

References

Cambrian fossil record
Extinct molluscs
Paleozoic life of Newfoundland and Labrador
Paleozoic life of Nova Scotia